The University of Kairouan is a public research university located in Kairouan, Tunisia, and it was founded 2 September 2004.

History

Buildings, collections and facilities

Organization
The university of Kairouan is formed by nine higher institutes:

Faculty of Arts and Humanities of Kairouan
The faculty is a public research faculty located in Kairouan, Tunisia. It was founded on 31 December 1984. The core of the faculty is formed by five academic departments; Arabic, English, French, Philosophy and Archaeology Department.

Higher Institute of Arts and Crafts of Kairouan
It was founded on 9 July 2002.

Higher Institute of Computer Science and Management of Kairouan
It was founded on 9 July 2002.

Higher Institute of Juridical and political Studies of Kairouan
It was founded on 14 July 2005.

Higher Institute of Applied Sciences and Technology of Kairouan
It was founded on 6 June 2006.

Higher Institute of Arts and Crafts of Kasserine
It was founded on 14 July 2005.

Higher Institute of Applied Mathematics and Computer Science of Kairouan
It was founded on 6 June 2006.

Higher Institute of Applied Studies in Human Sciences of Sbeitla 
It is a public institute located in Sbeitla. It was founded in 2007.
In the academic year 2009–2010, the number of students of the institute reached 1200 students divided in two fields; literature and human sciences.

Higher Institute of Arts and Crafts of Sidi Bouzid
It was founded on 8 September 2008, and it is located in Sidi Bouzid.

Notable alumni and academics
 Bouraoui Agina, Tunisian author and researcher.
 Ahmed Jdey, Tunisian historian
 Seifeddine Rezgui, alleged perpetrator of the 2015 Sousse attacks.

References 

 
2004 establishments in Tunisia
Universities in Tunisia
Educational institutions established in 2004
Kairouan